Nord 4.001 to 4.075 and 4.636 to 4.990, also called 180 unités, were 0-8-0 locomotives for freight traffic of the Chemins de Fer du Nord.

Construction history

The locomotives were built in several batches by various manufacturers. 
Starting with 1879 a Belpaire firebox was installed in the newly built machines, and beginning with 1890 the locomotives were equipped with a cab. 

In 1921 the remaining machines were renumbered as follows: 
 4.001 – 4.075 became 4.601 – 4.674 (4.005 was written off in 1908)
 4.636 – 4.800 became 4.702 – 4.853
 4.801 – 4.850 became 4.856 – 4.878
 4.881 – 4.919 became 4.881 – 4.930
 4.954 – 4.990 became 4.931 – 4.954

References

Bibliography

External links
 ETH-Bibliothek Zürich, Bildarchiv. Nord 4.968, Schneider & Cie Le Creusot, viewer
 ETH-Bibliothek Zürich, Bildarchiv. Nord 4.034, Wiener Neustädter Lokomotivfabrik, viewer

Steam locomotives of France
4.001
0-8-0 locomotives
Railway locomotives introduced in 1866
D n2 locomotives
Schneider locomotives
Cockerill locomotives
Fives-Lille locomotives
Floridsdorf locomotives
Wiener Neustädter locomotives

Freight locomotives